Spake may refer to:

Jeremy Spake (born 1969), English TV personality
Shannon Spake (born 1976), American Sports reporter